Love and Learn is a lost 1928 silent film comedy directed by Frank Tuttle and starring Esther Ralston. Famous Players-Lasky produced the picture with released through Paramount Pictures.

Plot summary

Cast
 Esther Ralston - Nancy Blair
 Lane Chandler - Anthony Cowles
 Hedda Hopper - Mrs. Ann Blair
 Claude King - Robert Blair
 Jack J. Clark - Hansen (*as John J. Clark)
 Jack Trent - Jim Riley
 Hal Craig - Sgt. Flynn
 Helen Lynch - Rosie
 Catherine Parrish - Jail Matron
 Martha Franklin - Martha
 Jerry Mandy - Gardener
 Dorothea Wolbert - Maid
 Johnnie Morris - Bum (*as Johnny Morris)
 Guy Oliver - Detective

References

External links
 Love and Learn at IMDb.com
 
 
 

1928 films
American silent feature films
Paramount Pictures films
Famous Players-Lasky films
Films directed by Frank Tuttle
Silent American comedy films
Films with screenplays by Herman J. Mankiewicz
1928 comedy films
American black-and-white films
Lost American films
1928 lost films
Lost comedy films
Films with screenplays by Florence Ryerson
1920s English-language films
1920s American films